

Meliphagoidea is a superfamily of passerine birds. They contain a vast diversity of small to mid-sized songbirds widespread in the Austropacific region. The Australian Continent has the largest richness in genera and species.

Systematics
This group was proposed based on the phenetic DNA-DNA hybridization studies of Charles Sibley et al.. A more modern definition of a monophyletic Meliphagoidea based on cladistic analysis was made by ornithologists at the American Museum of Natural History.

Families
Family Maluridae: fairy-wrens, emu-wrens and grasswrens
Family Dasyornithidae: bristlebirds. Formerly in Acanthizidae.
Family Acanthizidae: scrubwrens, thornbills and gerygones
Family Pardalotidae: pardalotes (but see below)
Family Meliphagidae: honeyeaters
 

The Sibley-Ahlquist taxonomy controversially redefines the families Acanthizidae (spinebills) and Dasyornithidae (bristlebirds) as subfamilies within the larger family Pardalotidae (pardalotes). However, later work indicated that the Pardalotidae are more closely related to the Meliphagidae (honeyeaters) and could be considered a subfamily within them. The Acanthizidae have also been traditionally considered aberrant honeyeaters, and could also be considered a subfamily of Meliphagidae; however, they seem to be very ancient members of Meliphagoidea and if the pardalotes are separated as a distinct family apart from Meliphagidae, the spinebills might be split off too. But some ornithologists maintain that separating the spinebills and pardalotes into separate families would mean creating two monotypic families with a mere six species in total, and so keeping the spinebills within the Meliphagidae and possibly merging the pardalotes therein as well seems to be a more sensible course of action.

The Sibley-Ahlquist taxonomy also placed the Petroicidae (Australasian "robins") in the Meliphagoidea. This is now no longer favoured; as more recent work show that they form a distinct lineage of uncertain relationships; all that can be said at present with reasonable certainty is that the Petroicidae are neither Passerida ("advanced" songbirds) nor a very ancient songbird group.

References

Further reading

External links
 Meliphagoidea - Highlighting relationships of Maluridae on Tree Of Life Web Project

 
Bird superfamilies
Passeri